Elise Burgin (born March 5, 1962) is a retired American tennis player. She achieved WTA rankings of 22 in singles and 7 in doubles.

Personal life
Burgin, who is Jewish, was born in Baltimore, Maryland and grew up in Maryland.

Tennis career
Before playing professionally, Burgin was an outstanding singles and doubles player at Stanford University, from which she graduated. A four-time All-American from 1981 to 1984, she teamed with Linda Gates in 1984 to win the NCAA doubles championship.

She competed professionally from 1980 to 1993. In 1982, she reached the fourth round of the US Open (where she was beaten by Bonnie Gadusek), her best performance in singles in a Grand Slam tournament. In 1986, she won her only career singles title at Charleston, South Carolina.

Burgin was a member of the U.S. Federation Cup team in 1985 and 1987. In 1986, Burgin was captain of the U.S. Wightman Cup team.

During her career, she won eleven tournaments on the WTA Tour, including ten in doubles. She reached No. 7 in the world in doubles.

After retiring in 1993, Burgin has become a tennis commentator.

In 2003, she was inducted into the USTA Mid–Atlantic Tennis Hall of Fame.

WTA career finals

Singles: 4 (1 title, 3 runner-ups)

Doubles: 29 (10 titles, 19 runner-ups)

See also
List of select Jewish tennis players

References

External links
 
 
 

1962 births
Living people
American female tennis players
Sportspeople from Baltimore
Jewish American sportspeople
Jewish tennis players
Stanford Cardinal women's tennis players
Tennis people from Maryland
Tennis commentators
21st-century American Jews
21st-century American women